was a  after Tenna and before Genroku. This period spanned the years from February 1684 through September 1688.

Change of era
 1684 :  The new era of Jōkyō (meaning "Taking Righteousness") was created to mark the start of a new cycle of the Chinese zodiac. The previous era ended and the new one commenced in Tenna 4, on the 21st day of the 2nd month.

Subsequently, the power to create a calendar shifted to the Tokugawa shogunate, and the authority of the Imperial calendar was diminished after 1684. In that year, the astrology bureau of the Tokugawa bakufu created a "Japanese" calendar which was independent of Chinese almanacs.

Events of the Jōkyō era
 1684 (Jōkyō 1): A fire burned the Kyoto Imperial Palace to ashes. The reconstruction took a year.
 1684 (Jōkyō 1): Having met with success in Osaka's kabuki theater, Chikamatsu Monzaemon began to write plays for the kabuki audience in Heian-kyō. In part, his success stemmed from the way his work would sometimes mirror current happenings and contemporary urban characters.
 March 26, 1685 (Jōkyō 2, 22nd day of the 2nd month): The former Emperor Go-Sai died. A large comet appeared in the night sky.
 April 13, 1686 (Jōkyō 3, 21st day of the 3rd month): Emperor Reigen abdicated in favor of his son, who become Emperor Higashiyama. After abdication, Reigen's  new home was called the Sentō-gosho (The Palace for an Ex-Emperor). The Jōkyō Uprising occurred in October.
 December 20, 1687 (Jōkyō 4, 16th day of the 11th month): The esoteric Daijō-sai ceremony, having been in abeyance since the time of Emperor Go-Kashiwabara—for nine reigns—was revived because of the bakufus insistence. This Shinto ritual is performed only once by each emperor during the enthronement ceremonies.

Notes

See also
 Edo period
 Jōkyō calendar

References
 Bock, Felicia G. (1990). "The Great Feast of the Enthronement", Monumenta Nipponica, Vol. 45, No. 1.
 Calvert, Robert. (2003). Les Japonais: Histoire d'un peuple. Paris: Armand Colin.  ;  OCLC 319808494
 Nicolas Fiévé, Nicolas and Paul Waley. (2003). Japanese Capitals in Historical Perspective: Place, Power and Memory in Kyoto, Edo and Tokyo. London: Routledge.  ;  OCLC 679941527
 Murdoch, James. (1903).  A History of Japan. Yokohama: Kelly & Walsh. 
 Nussbaum, Louis Frédéric and Käthe Roth. (2005). Japan Encyclopedia. Cambridge: Harvard University Press. ; OCLC 48943301
 Ponsonby-Fane, Richard Arthur Brabazon. (1956). Kyoto: The Old Capital of Japan, 794–1869. Kyoto: Ponsonby Memorial Society. 
 Screech, Timon. (2006). Secret Memoirs of the Shoguns: Isaac Titsingh and Japan, 1779–1822. London: RoutledgeCurzon. ; OCLC 65177072
 Titsingh, Isaac. (1834). Nihon Ōdai Ichiran; ou, Annales des empereurs du Japon. Paris: Royal Asiatic Society, Oriental Translation Fund of Great Britain and Ireland. OCLC 5850691.

External links
 National Diet Library, "The Japanese Calendar" -- historical overview plus illustrative images from library's collection

Japanese eras
1680s in Japan